This is a list of events that Invicta Fighting Championships have held since their inaugural event, Invicta FC 1: Coenen vs. Ruyssen. The promotion has held 57 events as of March 2023.

Invicta FC 53: DeCoursey vs. Dos Santos

Invicta FC 53: DeCoursey vs. Dos Santos is an upcoming mixed martial arts event scheduled to be headlined by Jillian DeCoursey defending her atomweight championship against Rayanne Dos Santos.

Card

Invicta FC 52: Machado vs. McCormack

Invicta FC 52: Machado vs. McCormack was a mixed martial arts event headlined by Valesca Machado defending her strawweight championship against Danni McCormack. Montserrat Rendon was scheduled to fight Alexa Conners, but Conners was forced to withdraw and was replaced by Maria Favela. Favela later withdrew from the fight and the bout was removed from the card. Ramona Pascual was scheduled to fight Amber Leibrock but Leibrock withdrew after signing with PFL and was replaced by Kaylee Vos. However, Pascual was then unable to compete and the bout was removed from the card.

Results

Invicta FC 51: Tennant vs. Bernardo

Invicta FC 51: Tennant vs. Bernardo was a mixed martial arts event headlined by Taneisha Tennant defending her bantamweight championship against Talita Bernardo. The co-main event will see Kristina Williams and Ketlen Souza face off for the vacant flyweight championship. The night before the event, the fight between Tanya Nijjar and Sayury Canon was removed from the card after Nijar missed weight.  Serena DeJesus came in at 137.3 pounds, 1.3 pounds over the limit and was fined 25% of her purse which went to Rubin.

Results

|-

|-

|-

|-

|-

|-

Invicta FC 50

Invicta FC 50 was a mixed martial arts event that featured a one night tournament to crown the new Invicta FC Strawweight Champion. The tournament included Gloria de Paula, Ediana Silva, Karolina Wójcik, and Valesca Machado. The co-main event featured Talita Bernardo vs. Katharina Lehner in a bout originally scheduled for Invicta FC 48. Danni McCormack was scheduled to fight Fatima Kline but Kline was replaced by Maira Mazar. Claire Guthrie was scheduled to fight Marilla Morais, but Morais was replaced by Brigid Chase. Melissa Oddessa was scheduled to fight Sharon Jacobson, however four days before the event Jacobson was replaced by Elise Pone.

Results

Invicta FC 49: Delboni vs. DeCoursey

Invicta FC 49: Delboni vs. DeCoursey was a mixed martial arts event headlined by Jéssica Delboni defending her atomweight championship against Jillian DeCoursey. The co-main event was set to feature Kristina Williams vs. Ketlen Souza but Williams was replaced by Maiju Suotama.

Results

Invicta FC 48: Tennant vs. Rubin

Invicta FC 48: Tennant vs. Rubin was a mixed martial arts event headlined by Taneisha Tennant defending her bantamweight championship against Olga Rubin. The co-main event was set to feature Katharina Lehner fighting Talita Bernardo, but Lehner withdrew from the bout and was replaced by Yana Gadelha. Mallory Martin pulled out of her fight against Kyra Batara and was replaced by Valesca Machado.

Results

Invicta FC 47: Ducote vs. Zappitella

Invicta FC 47: Ducote vs. Zappitella was a mixed martial arts event headlined by Emily Ducote defending her strawweight championship against former atomweight champion Alesha Zappitella. Serena DeJesus was scheduled to fight Lisa Verzosa, but Verzosa pulled out and was replaced by Brittney Cloudy.

Results

Invicta FC 46: Rodríguez vs. Torquato II

Invicta FC 46: Rodríguez vs. Torquato II was a mixed martial arts event headlined by Karina Rodríguez defending her flyweight championship against Daiana Torquato in a rematch from the main event of Invicta FC on AXS TV. Karina was originally scheduled to defend against Ketlen Souza, but Souza withdrew from the bout four days before the event and was replaced by Torquato. Torquato was originally set to fight Milana Dudieva in the night's co-main event. Dudieva was then matched up instead with newcomer Denise Gomes.

At the weigh-ins, Liz Tracy missed weight for her bout, weighing in at 117.8 pounds, 1.8 pounds over the strawweight non-title fight limit. The bout proceeded at catchweight and Tracy was fined 25 percent of her purse, which went to her opponent. A planned fight between Fatima Kline and Nadia Vera was removed from the card.

Results

Invicta FC 45: Zappitella vs. Delboni II

Invicta FC 45: Zappitella vs. Delboni II was a mixed martial arts event headlined by Alesha Zappitella defending her atomweight championship against Jéssica Delboni in a rematch from Invicta FC 44. A bout between Emily Whitmire and Hilarie Rose was scheduled but has since been postponed. The originally planned co-main event between Claire Guthrie and Lauren Mueller was removed from the card on December 31. Katie Saull was scheduled to fight Tabatha Watkins, however Watkins was replaced by Tamika Jones on the week of the event. Additionally, Shamir Peshewa replaced Courtney King in the night's co-main event.

At the weigh-ins, Shamir Peshewa and Maria Favela missed weight for their bouts. Peshewa weighed in at 153.4 pounds and Pavela weighed in at 138.4 pounds, 2.4 pounds over the bantamweight non-title fight limit. The bouts proceeded at catchweight and they were fined 25 percent of their purses, which went to their opponents.

Results

Invicta FC 44: A New Era

Invicta FC 44: A New Era was a mixed martial arts event headlined by a strawweight title bout between Emily Ducote and Danielle Taylor. Lisa Verzosa and Taneisha Tennant fought for the vacant Invicta FC Bantamweight Championship in the co-main event. The main card will air on pay per view with prelims taking place on AXS TV. Lauren Mueller was scheduled to fight Monica Franco but Franco pulled out due to COVID 19 and was replaced by Serena DeJesus. A week before the event, Kelly D'Angelo pulled out of her fight with Jodie Esquibel and was replaced by Liz Tracy. On August 23, the week of the event, Mara Romero Borella and Monique Adriane pulled out of their fights against Brogan Sanchez and Katie Saull respectively. Borella was replaced by Emilee King, while Adriane was replaced by Marisa Messer-Belenchia.

Results

|-

|-

|-

Bonus awards
The following fighters were awarded monetary bonuses:
Fight of the Night:
Performance of the Night: Emily Ducote, Brogan Walker-Sanchez and Kayla Yontef

Phoenix Tournament: Atomweight

Phoenix Tournament: Atomweight was a mixed martial arts event that featured an atomweight tournament including 8 fighters vying for a shot at the atomweight championship. The tournament participants were announced to include recent title challenger Jéssica Delboni, Lindsey VanZandt, Jillian DeCoursey, Linda Mihalec, Katie Saull, Paulina Granados, Tabatha Watkins, and Katie Perez. Four days before the event, Katie Saull was forced out of the tournament due to travel restrictions and was replaced by Marisa Messer-Belenchia. Like previous Phoenix Tournament events, the first two rounds will be one-round exhibitions, while only the final will be a full three round fight that counts towards the fighter's record.

An online voting system was introduced to determine first round matchups for the Phoenix Tournament.

Results

Invicta FC on AXS TV: Rodríguez vs. Torquato

Invicta FC: Rodríguez vs. Torquato (also known as Invicta on AXS TV: Rodríguez vs. Torquato) was a mixed martial arts event headlined by Karina Rodríguez against Daiana Torquato for the vacant Invicta flyweight championship. The co-main event will feature  Alesha Zappitella defending her atomweight championship against Jéssica Delboni. This event will be the first under the new ownership of Anthem Sports & Entertainment. The entire card will stream worldwide on Invicta's YouTube and Facebook pages, while AXS TV in the US and The Fight Network is Canada will also carry the main card.

Scheduled fights between Emily Ducote and Liz Tracy as well as Taneisha Tennant against Hope Chase were both removed from the card the week before the event.

At the weigh-ins, Josee Storts missed weight for her bout. Storts weighed in at 128.7 pounds, 2.7 pounds over the flyweight non-title fight limit. The bout proceeded at catchweight and she was fined 25 percent of her purse, which went to her opponent Maria Favela.

Results

|-

|-

Bonus awards
Fight of the Night: Karina Rodríguez vs. Daiana Torquato

Invicta FC 43: King vs. Harrison

Invicta FC 43: King vs. Harrison was a mixed martial arts event. It was originally scheduled to be headlined by Pearl Gonzalez and Erin Blanchfield fighting for the vacant flyweight title. Due to COVID-19, the planned title fight was forced to be postponed. The previous co-main event of Emily Ducote and Montserrat Ruiz fighting for the vacant strawweight title was then moved up to become the main event. Stephanie Geltmacher was scheduled to fight Trisha Cicero, but Cicero withdrew the week before the event and was replaced by Caitlin Sammons. The event will also feature the promotional debut of undefeated Olympic judo gold medalist, Kayla Harrison.

The day before the event, the planned main event of Ducote vs. Ruiz was called off and postponed due to COVID 19. As a result, Kayla Harrison's debut against Courtney King was moved up to become the new main event.

Results

Bonus awards
The following fighters were awarded monetary bonuses:
Performance of the Night: Alesha Zappitella and Kayla Harrison

Invicta FC 42: Cummins vs. Zappitella

Invicta FC 42: Cummins vs. Zappitella was a mixed martial arts event headlined by Ashley Cummins and Alesha Zappitella for the vacant Invicta Atomweight Championship. A bout between Auttumn Norton and Brittney Cloudy was cancelled the night before the event due to COVID-19. Jennifer Chieng was scheduled to fight Flore Hani but Hani tested positive for COVID-19 as well and was replaced by Helen Peralta.

Results

Bonus awards
The following fighters were awarded monetary bonuses:
Fight of the Night: Victoria Leonardo vs. Liz Tracy
Performance of the Night: Alesha Zappitella

Invicta FC 41: Morandin vs. Ruiz

Invicta FC 41: Morandin vs. Ruiz was a mixed martial arts event headlined by Janaisa Morandin and Montserrat Ruiz. The co-main event was set to feature Erin Blanchfield against Stephanie Geltmacher, however Geltmatcher was forced to withdraw and was replaced by Brogan Walker-Sanchez. On July 19, Cynthia Arceo was forced to withdraw from her bout against Itzel Esquivel and was replaced by Kelly D'Angelo. The night of the event, the bout between Esqivel and D'Angelo was removed from the card due to testing for COVID-19.

Results

Bonus awards
The following fighters were awarded monetary bonuses:
Fight of the Night: None
Performance of the Night: Montserrat Ruiz,  Erin Blanchfield and Alexa Culp

Invicta FC 40: Ducote vs. Lima

Invicta FC 40: Ducote vs. Lima was a mixed martial arts event headlined by Emily Ducote and Juliana Lima. Laura Gallardo was scheduled to fight Claire Guthrie, but Guthrie withdrew and was replaced by Trisha Cicero. A bout between DeAnna Bennett and Victoria Leonardo was removed the day before the event after Bennett had a medical issue during her weight cut and could not weigh in.

Results

Bonus awards
The following fighters were awarded monetary bonuses:
Fight of the Night: none awarded
Performance of the Night: Emily Ducote and Chelsea Chandler

Phoenix Series 3

Phoenix Series 3 was a mixed martial arts event headlined by Lisa Verzosa against Julija Stoliarenko for the vacant Invicta Bantamweight Championship and featured a one night bantamweight tournament as the third installment of The Phoenix Tournament (then known as the Phoenix Series). The participants in the tournament announced on February 5 were Kerri Kenneson, Brittney Victoria, Erin Harpe, Taneisha Tennant, Claire Guthrie, Hope Chase, Auttumn Norton, and Taylor Guardado. This event will feature open scoring between rounds after the Kansas Athletic Commission gave promoters this option following several controversial scorecards at UFC 247. On February 18, it was announced that Erin Harpe and Auttumn Norton had both pulled out of the tournament. As a result, Julia Ottolino, who was to compete in a tournament reserve bout, and Gillian Noll were added as replacements. Ottolino's original opponent, Serena DeJesus received a new opponent in Florina Moeller. On February 28, the scheduled fight between Amber Brown and Sharon Jacobson was cancelled after an injury to Brown. On March 2, four days before the event, Gillian Noll withdrew from the tournament and was replaced by Serena DeJesus, who had been scheduled to be in a tournament reserve bout. As a result, DeJesus was replaced by Kelly Clayton in the reserve bout against Florina Moeller.

Results

Invicta FC 39: Frey vs. Cummins II

Invicta FC 39: Frey vs. Cummins II was a mixed martial arts event that is scheduled to be headlined by Jinh Yu Frey defending her Atomweight Championship against Ashley Cummins. The fight was originally set to headline Invicta FC 37 in October 2019 but Frey pulled out due to injury. Daiana Torquato was scheduled to fight Mariya Agapova, but Agapova was forced to pull out due to injury on January 25 and was replaced by Shanna Young. However Young ended up being deemed medically unfit to compete and the fight was canceled. At the weigh-ins for the event, Jinh Yu Frey missed weight and as a result, was stripped of her atomweight championship. The fight would go on with only Cummins fighting for the title, and if Frey won then she would receive the next title shot.

Results

Bonus awards
The following fighters were awarded monetary bonuses:
Fight of the Night: None
Performance of the Night: Miranda Maverick and Erin Blanchfield

Invicta FC 38: Murata vs. Ducote

Invicta FC 38: Murata vs. Ducote was a mixed martial arts event that was headlined by Kanako Murata vs. Emily Ducote for the vacant strawweight championship. The original main event was Vanessa Porto defending her flyweight championship against top contender Karina Rodríguez, who earned her shot by winning the flyweight tournament at Invicta FC 35, however Rodríguez failed to make weight thus was no longer able to contend for the championship and the bout was changed to a non-title fight as the co-main event.

Results

Bonus awards
The following fighters were awarded monetary bonuses:
Fight of the Night: Vanessa Porto vs. Karina Rodríguez (Rodríguez forfeits bonus due to weight miss) and Lisa Verzosa vs. Kerri Kenneson
Performance of the Night: None

Invicta FC 37: Gonzalez vs. Sanchez

Invicta FC 37: Gonzalez vs. Sanchez was a mixed martial arts event that will be headlined by Pearl Gonzalez against undefeated Brogan Sanchez. The event was originally scheduled to feature Jinh Yu Frey defending her atomweight championship against Ashley Cummins in the main event, however on September 23, Frey was forced to withdraw due to injury causing the bout to be rescheduled. As a result, the previous co-main event of Gonzalez vs. Sanchez was moved up to become the main event.

Results

Bonus awards
The following fighters were awarded monetary bonuses:
Fight of the Night: Kay Hansen vs. Nicolle Caliari
Performance of the Night: Mariya Agapova and Hope Chase

Phoenix Series 2

Phoenix Series 2 was a mixed martial arts event that featured a one-night flyweight tournament as the second installment in The Phoenix Tournament (then known as the Phoenix Series). The participants of the tournament were announced on August 12 to be DeAnna Bennett, Milana Dudieva, Miranda Maverick, Cheri Muraski, Liz Tracy, Daiana Torquato, Marila Santos, and Maiju Suotama. On August 22, Shanna Young replaced Cheri Muraski while on August 27, Victoria Leonardo replaced Marila Santos.  The tournament followed standard format for The Phoenix Tournament, including match-ups determined by a random draw. Two non-tournament bouts have been scheduled for the event: a flyweight match between Alexa Conners and Mariya Agapova as the co-main event, and a flyweight match between Josee Storts and Helen Lucero. The card will also feature two tournament reserve bouts. Chantel Coates missed weight for her reserve bout thus she was fined 25% of her fight purse and would no longer be eligible to enter the tournament as a reserve in case of injury.

Results

Invicta FC 36: Sorenson vs. Young

Invicta FC 36: Sorenson vs. Young was a mixed martial arts event headlined by Pam Sorenson vs. Kaitlin Young for the vacated featherweight championship after former champion Felicia Spencer signed with the UFC. Alyse Anderson was scheduled to fight Anastasia Nikolakakos, however Anastasia withdrew a week before the event and was replaced by Katie Saull. At the weigh-ins, Janaisa Morandin missed weight by three pounds over the limit and was fined 25% of her purse. Chantel Coates also missed weight by half a pound over the limit.

Results

Bonus awards
The following fighters were awarded monetary bonuses:
Fight of the Night: Victoria Leonardo vs. Stephanie Geltmacher
Performance of the Night: Caitlin Sammons and Emily Ducote

Invicta FC 35: Bennett vs. Rodriguez II

Invicta FC 35: Bennett vs. Rodriguez II was a mixed martial arts event headlined by a rematch between DeAnna Bennett and Karina Rodriguez in the finals of the Invicta FC Flyweight Tournament. The two previously met at Invicta FC 28 in March 2018.

Results

Invicta FC Flyweight Tournament Bracket

Bonus awards
The following fighters were awarded monetary bonuses:
Fight of the Night: Loma Lookboonmee vs. Monique Adriane
Performance of the Night: Chelsea Chandler and Kanako Murata

Phoenix Series 1

Phoenix Series 1 (retroactive nomenclature; originally known as Phoenix Rising 1 or Phoenix Rising Series 1) was a mixed-martial arts event featuring the first in a new series of tournaments produced by Invicta FC for each weight division. The Phoenix Tournament (then known as the Phoenix Rising Series) features a one-night tournament format in which the quarter-final and semi-final bouts are one-round contests, and the tournament final is a three-round bout. Tournament participants are matched up by random draw. Reserve bouts for the tournament are one-round contests, and are classified as exhibitions. Bonuses are awarded for each finish, and the fighter with the fastest finish in the quarterfinals may choose their opponent for the next round from among the other semi-finalists. On March 2, the announced participants in the tournament were Mizuki Inoue, Danielle Taylor, Janaisa Morandin, Juliana Lima, Kailin Curran, Brianna van Buren, Sharon Jacobson, and Sunna Davíðsdóttir.

On April 16, Invicta FC announced the quarter-final matchups for the tournament, as determined by random draw. In addition, the winner of the tournament would become the new Invicta FC Strawweight Champion, earning the title vacated by Virna Jandiroba upon signing with the UFC.

The night before the event, Janaisa Morandin missed weight and was pulled from the tournament while Mizuki was forced to withdraw due to complications with her weight cut. Morandin and Mizuki were replaced in their matchups by Manjit Kolekar and Amber Brown, respectively. Kolekar and Brown were originally matched up against each other in a reserve bout.

Results

Invicta FC Strawweight Tournament Bracket

Invicta FC 34: Porto vs. Gonzalez

Invicta FC 34: Porto vs. Gonzalez was a mixed martial arts event to be headlined by a fight between Vanessa Porto and Pearl Gonzalez for the vacant Invicta FC Flyweight Championship. The event will also feature the beginning of a flyweight tournament to determine the next number one contender. The tournament originally was to feature undefeated Brogan Walker-Sanchez against Milana Dudieva in addition to Tracy Cortez vs. Karina Rodriguez being the reserve bout for the tournament but Walker-Sanchez pulled out so Rodriguez was moved up from the reserve bout into the tournament spot against Dudieva. Rodriguez was replaced in her original bout by Erin Blanchfield. Helena Kolesnyk vs. Faith McMah was removed from the card after Kolesnyk failed to make weight at 11 pounds over the featherweight limit. Holli Logan also missed weight and was fined 25% of her purse.

Results

Invicta FC Flyweight Tournament Bracket

Bonus awards
The following fighters were awarded monetary bonuses:
Fight of the Night: Karina Rodríguez vs. Milana Dudieva
Performance of the Night: Victoria Leonardo and Caitlin Sammons

Invicta FC 33: Frey vs. Grusander II

Invicta FC 33: Frey vs Grusander II was a mixed martial arts event headlined by a rematch between Jinh Yu Frey and Minna Grusander for the Invicta FC Atomweight Championship. The two previously headlined Invicta 30 in July where Frey won the championship in a closely contested decision victory. Chantel Coates will meet Ashlynn Kleinbeck in a bout originally scheduled for Invicta FC 31 and that fight will again be planned to air on both Facebook and UFC Fight Pass. Sharon Jacobson was scheduled to fight Kanako Murata but Murata pulled out the week before the event and was replaced by Kay Hansen. At the weigh-ins, Jamie Moyle weighed in at 9 pounds over the strawweight limit and was fined 25% of her purse.

Results

Bonus awards
The following fighters were awarded monetary bonuses:
Fight of the Night: None
Performance of the Night: Kay Hansen, Alesha Zappitella, Anastasia Nikolakakos, and Chantel Coates

Invicta FC 32: Spencer vs. Sorenson

Invicta FC 32: Spencer vs. Sorenson was a mixed martial arts event headlined by Felicia Spencer vs. Pam Sorenson for the vacant Invicta FC Featherweight Championship. The event will also feature the Invicta return of Kaitlin Young, who had been working as a matchmaker for the company.

Erin Blanchfield was originally scheduled to fight Luanna Alzuguir but Alzuguir's MMA debut was delayed so she was replaced by Kay Hansen, who called out Blanchfield after her victory at Invicta FC 31. Mizuki was originally scheduled to fight Heather Jo Clark in the semi main event but Clark was forced out due to injury on October 4 and replaced by former UFC fighter Viviane Pereira who would make her Invicta debut. Kaitlin Young was set to fight Zarah Fairn Dos Santos, however due to visa issues Dos Santos was replaced by Sarah Patterson on the week of the event  and the fight proceeded at 150-pound catchweight affair to accommodate Patterson.

At the weigh-ins, Mizuki Inoue, Sarah Patterson and Chelsea Chandler missed the required weight for their respective fights. Inoue weighed in at 116.4 pounds, 0.4 pound over the strawweight non-title fight limit of 126. Patterson weighed in at 154.5 pounds, 3.5 pound over the catchweight fight limit of 150. Meanwhile, Chandler weighed in at 136.6 pounds, 0.6 pound over the bantamweight non-title fight limit of 136. All of them were fined 25 percent of their purse, which went to their opponents Viviane Pereira, Kaitlin Young  and Mitzi Merry.

Results

Bonus awards
The following fighters were awarded monetary bonuses:
Fight of the Night: Stephanie Geltmacher vs. Liz Tracy
Performance of the Night: Julia Avila

Invicta FC 31: Jandiroba vs. Morandin

Invicta FC 31: Jandiroba vs. Morandin was a mixed martial arts event to be headlined by Virna Jandiroba defending her strawweight championship against Janaisa Morandin. The bout was originally scheduled to headline Invicta 28 before Morandin pulled out due to injury. Shanna Young was scheduled to fight Raquel Pa'aluhi, but Pa'aluhi pulled out and was replaced by  Lisa Spangler.

An additional fight between debuting fighters Chantel Coates and Ashlynn Kleinbeck was scheduled as a bonus fight to air on Facebook Live but was cancelled after Kleinbeck had to have her appendix removed. As a result, the first fight of the night aired on both UFC Fight Pass and Facebook Live.

At the weigh-ins, Mallory Martin weighed in at 117 pounds, 1 pounds over the strawweight non-title fight limit of 116 pounds. Her bout against Ashley Nichols was contested at catchweight and she forfeited 25 percent of her purse.

Results

|-

Bonus awards
The following fighters were awarded monetary bonuses:
Fight of the Night: Lisa Spangler vs. Shanna Young
Performance of the Night: Virna Jandiroba and Miranda Maverick

Invicta FC 30: Frey vs. Grusander

Invicta FC 30: Frey vs. Grusander was a mixed martial arts event to be headlined by Jinh Yu Frey vs. Minna Grusander fighting for the vacant atomweight championship. Alesha Zappitella was scheduled to fight Shino VanHoose but VanHoose pulled out due to injury and was replaced by Jillian DeCoursey. Kerri Kenneson was set to fight Alexa Conners but Conners pulled out due to injury. Stephanie Geltmacher, who had her Bellator fight cancelled on July 12, stepped in to replace Conners.

Results

Bonus awards
The following fighters were awarded monetary bonuses:
Fight of the Night: None awarded
Performance of the Night: Felicia Spencer, Stephanie Geltmacher, Alesha Zappitella and Alyse Anderson

Invicta FC 29: Kaufman vs. Lehner

Invicta FC 29: Kaufman vs. Lehner was a mixed martial arts event headlined by Sarah Kaufman vs. Katharina Lehner fighting for the vacant bantamweight championship. Lisa Spangler was set to fight Yaya Rincon but the week of the event, Rincon pulled out of the bout and was replaced by Sarah Kleczka. 19 year old Croatian prospect Adriana Vukovic was scheduled to make her debut at this event but an opponent was not found for her, pushing her debut back to a future event.

Results

Bonus awards
The following fighters were awarded monetary bonuses:
Fight of the Night: Sarah Kaufman vs. Katharina Lehner
Performance of the Night: Pearl Gonzalez and Pannie Kianzad

Invicta FC 28: Mizuki vs. Jandiroba

Invicta FC 28: Mizuki vs. Jandiroba was a mixed martial arts event headlined by Mizuki Inoue vs. Virna Jandiroba fighting for the vacant strawweight championship. The event was originally scheduled to feature Virna Jandiroba vs. Janaisa Morandin for the title but Morandin pulled out of the fight on March 2. Mizuki was initially set to face Milana Dudieva before stepping in to replace Morandin in the main event. As a result, Dudieva was matched against Christina Marks.

Results

Bonus awards
The following fighters were awarded monetary bonuses:
Fight of the Night: Pearl Gonzalez vs. Kali Robbins
Performance of the Night: Kalyn Schwartz and Minna Grusander

Invicta FC 27: Kaufman vs. Kianzad

Invicta FC 27: Kaufman vs. Kianzad was a mixed martial arts event headlined by veteran Sarah Kaufman returning to Invicta against Pannie Kianzad. On December 6, Invicta announced Kaufman had been signed to return for a headline bout. A strawweight bout between Mallory Martin and Tiffany Masters was made after being originally scheduled for Invicta FC 24.

Results

Bonus awards
The following fighters were awarded monetary bonuses:
Fight of the Night: Sharon Jacobson vs. Ashley Nichols and Felicia Spencer vs. Akeela Al-Hameed
Performance of the Night: None awarded

Invicta FC 26: Maia vs. Niedźwiedź

Invicta FC 26: Maia vs. Niedźwiedź was a mixed martial arts event headlined by Jennifer Maia defending her flyweight championship against top contender Agnieszka Niedzwiedz. Vanessa Porto was scheduled to fight Jessica-Rose Clark, but Clark accepted a fight with the UFC and was replaced by Milana Dudieva. On November 13, Invicta announced the signing of the undefeated Mackenzie Dern to debut against Kaline Medeiros. Janaisa Morandin was scheduled to fight Mizuki Inoue, but Mizuki pulled  out of the fight on November 27 and was replaced by Kinberly Novaes

Results

Bonus awards
The following fighters were awarded monetary bonuses:
Fight of the Night: Not awarded
Performance of the Night: Jennifer Maia, Mackenzie Dern, Janaisa Morandin, and Virna Jandiroba

Invicta FC 25: Kunitskaya vs. Pa'aluhi

Invicta FC 25: Kunitskaya vs. Pa'aluhi was a mixed martial arts event headlined by a fight between Yana Kunitskaya and Raquel Pa'aluhi for the vacated bantamweight championship. The co-main event was originally scheduled to be Lívia Renata Souza facing Jodie Esquibel for the vacated strawweight championship but Esquibel pulled out due to injury. Esquibel was replaced by Janaisa Morandin and the fight was then changed to a non-title bout. Amberlynn Orr was set to face Kelly McGill-Velasco but Kelly accepted a fight with the UFC and was replaced by newcomer Sarah Kleczka. Yaya Rincón was set to face Stephanie Egger but Egger withdrew and was replaced by Courtney King.

Results

Bonus awards
The following fighters were awarded monetary bonuses:
Fight of the Night: Lívia Renata Souza vs. Janaisa Morandin
Performance of the Night: Yana Kunitskaya and Yaya Rincón

Invicta FC 24: Dudieva vs. Borella

Invicta FC 24: Dudieva vs. Borella was a mixed martial arts event originally scheduled to be headlined by Megan Anderson; defending her featherweight championship against Helena Kolesnyk. However, Megan was signed by the UFC. As a result, Invicta bantamweight champion Tonya Evinger would move up to featherweight to replace Anderson in the fight against Kolesnyk. However, Anderson would end up pulling out of her UFC fight which then led to Evinger stepping in for that fight, removing her from this event. Due to the change, Helena Kolesnyk received a new opponent in Pam Sorenson while the previous co-main event of Milana Dudieva vs. Mara Romero Borella was moved up to become the new main event. A bout between Yana Kunitskaya and Raquel Pa'aluhi was removed with plans to reschedule due to Kunitskaya suffering an injury. The fight between Mallory Martin and Tiffany Masters was cancelled the day before the event due to medical issues.

Results

Bonus awards
The following fighters were awarded monetary bonuses:
Fight of the Night: Sunna Davíðsdóttir vs. Kelly D'Angelo
Performance of the Night: Felicia Spencer and Karina Rodríguez

Invicta FC 23: Porto vs. Niedźwiedź

Invicta FC 23: Porto vs. Niedźwiedź was the third women's mixed martial event held by Invicta FC in 2017 and is scheduled to be headlined by a flyweight bout between Vanessa Porto and Agnieszka Niedźwiedź

Results

Bonus awards
The following fighters were awarded monetary bonuses:
Fight of the Night: Roxanne Modafferi vs. Sarah D'Alelio and Hérica Tibúrcio vs. Tessa Simpson
Performance of the Night: none awarded

Invicta FC 22: Evinger vs. Kunitskaya II 

Invicta FC 22: Evinger vs. Kunitskaya II was a mixed martial arts event headlined by Tonya Evinger defending her bantamweight championship in a rematch against Yana Kunitskaya. The rematch comes after a controversial finish to their first fight, which headlined Invicta FC 20 and was overturned to a no contest. In the co-main event, Invicta atomweight champion Ayaka Hamasaki will move up to strawweight for a fight against former strawweight champion Lívia Renata Souza. A fight between Jinh Yu Frey and Janaisa Morandin was scheduled but canceled two days before the event when Morandin failed to make weight.

Results

Bonus awards
The following fighters were awarded monetary bonuses:
Fight of the Night: Sunna Davíðsdóttir vs. Mallory Martin
Performance of the Night: Lívia Renata Souza and Ashley Cummins

Invicta FC 21: Anderson vs. Tweet

Invicta FC 21: Anderson vs. Tweet was a mixed martial arts event that will be headlined by a bout between top featherweight contenders Megan Anderson and Charmaine Tweet competing for the interim featherweight championship. The event was scheduled to feature the MMA debut of undefeated professional boxer Heather Hardy against Brieta Carpenter, however Carpenter pulled out due to injury and the fight was removed from the card. A fight between Leah Letson and former UFC fighter Elizabeth Phillips was added instead. DeAnna Bennett was scheduled to fight Jodie Esquibel but pulled out of the fight and was replaced by Kali Robbins. Esquibel was then set to fight Robbins at a catchweight of 120 lbs but Robbins missed weight and the fight was canceled.

Results

Bonus awards
The following fighters were awarded monetary bonuses:
Fight of the Night: Amy Montenegro vs. Celine Haga ($1,500 each)
Performance of the Night: Megan Anderson and Leah Letson ($1,000 each)

Invicta FC 20: Evinger vs. Kunitskaya

Invicta FC 20: Evinger vs. Kunitskaya was a mixed martial arts event that was headlined by Invicta FC bantamweight champion Tonya Evinger defending her title against Russian newcomer Yana Kunitskaya. In the co-main event, strawweight champion Angela Hill will defend against Kaline Medeiros. In the controversial main event, Kunitskaya made Evinger submit to an armbar in the first round after the referee forced Evinger to move from a legal position leading to the submission. Evinger appealed the loss two weeks later and the Missouri athletic commission overturned the decision to a no contest.

Results

Bonus awards
The following fighters were awarded monetary bonuses:
Fight of the Night: Not awarded
Performance of the Night: Yana Kunitskaya, Hérica Tibúrcio, JJ Aldrich, and Alexa Conners

Invicta FC 19: Maia vs. Modafferi

Invicta FC 19: Maia vs. Modafferi was a mixed martial arts event that was headlined by Jennifer Maia defending her flyweight championship against Roxanne Modafferi. The event's co-main event featured atomweight champion Ayaka Hamasaki defending her title against top contender Jinh Yu Frey.

Results

Bonus awards
The following fighters were awarded monetary bonuses:
Fight of the Night: Jennifer Maia vs. Roxanne Modafferi ($1,500 each)
Performance of the Night: Irene Aldana and Julia Jones ($1,000 each)

Invicta FC 18: Grasso vs. Esquibel

Invicta FC 18: Grasso vs. Esquibel was a mixed martial arts event headlined by a strawweight fight between undefeated Alexa Grasso and Jodie Esquibel. The winner of the main event is expected to receive the next strawweight title shot against champion Angela Hill. The original co-main event was to be Irene Aldana facing undefeated Brazilian fighter Taila Santos to determine who challenges Tonya Evinger next for the bantamweight championship, however VISA issues forced Santos off the card and the fight was removed. Lynn Alvarez was scheduled to fight undefeated Indian fighter Manjit Kolekar but VISA issues forced Kolekar off the card and she was replaced by Mizuki Inoue. Agnieszka Niedzwiedz was scheduled to fight Claudia Rey but Rey was also unable to make the event due to VISA issues and was replaced by Christine Stanley. Aldana, Rey, and Santos are now being scheduled for the next event.

Results

Bonus awards
The following fighters were awarded monetary bonuses:
Fight of the Night: Tessa Simpson vs. Simona Soukupova ($1,500 each)
Performance of the Night: Alexa Grasso and Megan Anderson ($1,000 each)

Invicta FC 17: Evinger vs. Schneider

Invicta FC 17: Evinger vs. Schneider was a mixed martial arts event that was headlined by an Invicta FC Bantamweight Championship bout as champion Tonya Evinger defends against Colleen Schneider. The co-main event will feature Lívia Renata Souza defending her Invicta FC Strawweight Championship against Angela Hill. Aline Serrio was scheduled to fight Mizuki Inoue but Mizuki was replaced by Kaline Medeiros due to an injury in training. An atomweight bout between newcomers Tessa Simpson and Julia Jones was scheduled but removed from the card on the week of the event.

Results

Bonus awards
The following fighters were awarded monetary bonuses:
Fight of the Night: Rachael Ostovich vs. Ariel Beck ($1,500 each)
Performance of the Night: Angela Hill  and Megan Anderson ($1,000 each)

Invicta FC 16: Hamasaki vs. Brown

Invicta FC 16: Hamasaki vs. Brown was a mixed martial arts event that was headlined by an Invicta FC Atomweight Championship bout as champion Ayaka Hamasaki defended against Amber Brown. The co-main event will crown an interim flyweight champion in a fight between Vanessa Porto and Jennifer Maia while reigning champion Barb Honchak takes time off. The event was scheduled to feature the return of Alexa Grasso against Stephanie Eggink, however Grasso broke her hand a week before the event and was replaced by Angela Hill. Amberlynn Orr was set to debut against Kelly McGill but Orr was forced to pull out as well due to an injury and was replaced by Aspen Ladd.

Results

Bonus awards
The following fighters were awarded monetary bonuses:
Fight of the Night: Jennifer Maia vs. Vanessa Porto ($1,500 each) and Sarah D’Alelio vs. Andrea Lee ($1,500 each)
Performance of the Night: Angela Hill ($1,000 each)

Invicta FC 15: Cyborg vs. Ibragimova

Invicta FC 15: Cyborg vs. Ibragimova was a mixed martial arts event that was headlined by an Invicta FC Featherweight Championship bout with champion Cris Cyborg defending against Russian newcomer Daria Ibragimova. The event was originally scheduled to feature Cyborg dropping down in weight but it was later decided that she would remain at 145 and defend her championship. The co-main event will feature an Invicta FC Strawweight Championship bout with champion Lívia Renata Souza defending her title against undefeated challenger DeAnna Bennett. Souza was originally scheduled again to fight Alexa Grasso but it was announced on November 3 that Grasso had suffered an injury. Raquel Pa'aluhi was scheduled to fight Irene Aldana but Aldana was replaced by Colleen Schneider. Angela Hill was scheduled to fight Jodie Esquibel, but Esquibel was replaced by Alida Gray. Amber Brown was scheduled to fight Lisa Ellis, while Christine Stanley was scheduled to fight Shannon Sinn but on the week of the event, Ellis and Sinn pulled out and were replaced by Katy Collins and Shino VanHoose. Two days later, Collins also pulled out due to an injury in training leading to her fight with Christine Stanley being scrapped from the event. A fight between Ediane Gomes and Amanda Bell was scheduled but scrapped the day before the event after Gomes suffered complications with her weight cut. This event was first planned for November and then December before being set for January.

Results

Bonus awards
The following fighters were awarded monetary bonuses:
Fight of the Night: Megan Anderson vs. Amber Leibrock ($1,500 each)
Performance of the Night: Lívia Renata Souza, Mizuki Inoue and Angela Hill ($1,000 each)

Invicta FC 14: Evinger vs. Kianzad

Invicta FC 14: Evinger vs. Kianzad was a mixed martial arts event that took place on September 12, 2015. It was originally expected to be headlined by an Invicta FC Strawweight Championship bout between current champion Lívia Renata Souza and undefeated top contender Alexa Grasso, however Grasso was forced to withdraw due to injury. Invicta FC Bantamweight Champion Tonya Evinger was to defend her bantamweight title when she takes on Swedish fighter Pannie Kianzad in a contest originally scheduled as the co-main event. The day before the event, both fighters weighed in over the weight limit so the fight was changed to a non-title bout. JJ Aldrich was scheduled to fight Daniela Kortmann but Kortmann pulled out due to visa issues and was replaced by Rosa Acevedo.

Results

|-

|-

Bonus awards
The following fighters were awarded monetary bonuses:
Fight of the Night: Sharon Jacobson vs. Jamie Moyle
Performance of the Night: Tonya Evinger, Andrea Lee, and JJ Aldrich

Invicta FC 13: Cyborg vs. Van Duin

Invicta FC 13: Cyborg vs. Van Duin was a mixed martial arts event headlined by an Invicta FC Featherweight Championship bout between current champion Cris Cyborg and top contender Faith Van Duin.

The co-main event featured a bout for the vacant Invicta FC Bantamweight Championship between top contenders Tonya Evinger and Irene Aldana.

The event featured an Invicta FC Atomweight Championship bout between current champion Hérica Tibúrcio and top contender Ayaka Hamasaki.

Results

Bonus awards
The following fighters were awarded monetary bonuses:
Fight of the Night: Jamie Moyle vs. Amy Montenegro
Performance of the Night: Cris Cyborg and Amber Leibrock

Invicta FC 12: Kankaanpää vs. Souza

Invicta FC 12: Kankaanpää vs. Souza was a mixed martial-arts event held April 24, 2015, headlined by Katja Kankaanpää defending her strawweight championship against Lívia Renata Souza.

Sijara Eubanks was scheduled to fight Roma Pawelek but Pawlek pulled out due to injury the week of the event and was replaced by Gina Begley.

A fight between Cassie Rodish and Stephanie Skinner was originally scheduled but Skinner suffered an injury on the week of the show and the fight was pulled from the event.

Results

Bonus awards
The following fighters were awarded monetary bonuses:
Fight of the Night: Raquel Pa'aluhi vs. Ediane Gomes ($1,500 each) and Sharon Jacobson vs. Delaney Owen ($1,500 each)
Performance of the Night: Lívia Renata Souza and Faith Van Duin ($1,000 each)

Invicta FC 11: Cyborg vs. Tweet

Invicta FC 11: Cyborg vs. Tweet is a mixed-martial events that took place on February 27, 2015. The event was headlined by Cris Cyborg defending her featherweight championship against Charmaine Tweet. Christine Stanley was scheduled to face Emily Corso but Corso withdrew due to injury on January 30 and was replaced by Rachael Cummins. Two days before the event, Cummins withdrew due to suffering an injury in training and was replaced at the last minute by Laura Salazar. DeAnna Bennett was scheduled to face Lynn Alvarez but Alvarez withdrew due to injury on February 11 and was replaced by Norma Rueda Center. Irene Aldana was to face Melanie LaCroix but Melanie withdrew due to injury as well and was replaced by Colleen Schneider

Results

Bonus awards
The following fighters were awarded monetary bonuses:
Fight of the Night: Alexa Grasso vs. Mizuki Inoue
Performance of the Night: Cris Cyborg and Irene Aldana

Invicta FC 10: Waterson vs. Tiburcio

Invicta FC 10: Waterson vs. Tiburcio is a mixed martial arts event that took place on December 5, 2014. It was announced that Cris Cyborg would return and drop down in weight to bantamweight. However at Invicta FC 9, it was announced that Justino suffered an injury that forced her off the card. As a result, the new main event was announced to be atomweight champion Michelle Waterson defending her championship against Hérica Tibúrcio. The fight between Roxanne Modafferi and Vanessa Porto was expected to determine who gets the next title shot against Barb Honchak. On November 20, Porto was removed from the card due to visa issues and was replaced by Andrea Lee. A bantamweight bout between Irene Aldana and Marion Reneau was scheduled to take place but four days before the event, Aldana was hospitalized with bronchitis and it was announced that the fight would be postponed. On December 3, the fight between Charmaine Tweet and Faith Van Duin was pulled from the event due to medical concerns.

Results

Bonus awards
The following fighters were awarded monetary bonuses:
Fight of the Night: Hérica Tibúrcio vs. Michelle Waterson ($1,500 each)
Performance of the Night: Hérica Tibúrcio and Alexa Grasso ($1,000 each)

Invicta FC 9: Honchak vs. Hashi

Invicta FC 9: Honchak vs. Hashi  was a mixed martial-arts event that took place on November 1, 2014

Background

Invicta FC 9 was headlined by Barb Honchak defending her flyweight championship against Takayo Hashi. The co-main event was Mizuki Inoue against Karolina Kowalkiewicz.

Kaitlin Young was originally scheduled to fight Cindy Dandois but Dandois was forced to withdraw due to visa issues and was replaced by Raquel Pa'aluhi.

Herica Tiburcio vs. Ayaka Hamasaki has been scratched from this Invicta FC 9 event, as visa issues for Tiburcio have forced the 22-year-old Brazilian off the card at the last minute.

Results

Bonus awards
The following fighters were awarded monetary bonuses:
Fight of the Night: Karolina Kowalkiewicz vs. Mizuki Inoue
Performance of the Night: Raquel Pa'aluhi and Jamie Moyle

Invicta FC 8: Waterson vs. Tamada

Invicta FC 8: Waterson vs. Tamada was a mixed martial-arts event that took place on September 6, 2014.

Background

Invicta FC 8 was the first Invicta event to be broadcast on UFC's Fight Pass as part of the new deal between Invicta and UFC.

Invicta FC 8 was headlined by Michelle Waterson defending her atomweight championship against Yasuko Tamada along with a co-main event of Stephanie Eggink vs. Katja Kankaanpää for the vacant strawweight championship. The event also featured the third fight between Roxanne Modafferi and Tara LaRosa.
After the event, the co-main event of Katja Kankaanpää vs. Stephanie Eggink was awarded Fight of the Night.

Results

Bonus awards
The following fighters were awarded monetary bonuses:
Fight of the Night: Katja Kankaanpää vs. Stephanie Eggink
Performance of the Night: Irene Aldana and Tonya Evinger

Invicta FC 7: Honchak vs. Smith

Invicta FC 7: Honchak vs. Smith was a mixed martial-arts event that took place on December 7, 2013.

Background

The first announced fight saw Carla Esparza defend her strawweight championship against undefeated Cláudia Gadelha. The main event was announced to be Barb Honchak defending her flyweight championship against Leslie Smith. A third title fight took place as Lauren Murphy faced Miriam Nakamoto to crown the first Invicta FC Bantamweight Champion. The event also featured debuts of several fighters including Felice Herrig and Tonya Evinger.

Kelly Kobold was also scheduled to make her debut against Tonya Evinger, but Kobold pulled out of the fight on November 22 due to injury and was replaced by Sarah D'Alelio.

Carla Esparza was due to defend her strawweight title against Cláudia Gadelha, but Gadelha was taken to hospital with a bacterial infection and the bout was cancelled.

Like IFC 6, IFC 7 was available as a regular Pay-Per-View and also as an Internet Pay-Per-View.  The event was also available in High Definition PPV for a higher price, typically $10 more.), but the Internet Pay-Per-View hosting moved from Ustream to DaCast.

After the event, the main event of Barb Honchak vs. Leslie Smith was awarded Fight of the Night while Nina Ansaroff earned Knockout of the Night.

Results

Bonus awards
The following fighters were awarded monetary bonuses:
Fight of the Night: Barb Honchak vs. Leslie Smith ($1,500 each)
Knockout of the Night: Nina Ansaroff ($1,000)

Invicta FC 6: Coenen vs. Cyborg

Invicta FC 6: Coenen vs. Cyborg was a mixed martial arts event held on 13 July 2013. The event was headlined by Marloes Coenen vs Cris Cyborg to crown the first Invicta FC Featherweight Champion. It has been stated that the winner between Leslie Smith and Jennifer Maia will get a title shot against Flyweight Champion Barb Honchak. The fight between Charmaine Tweet and Ediane Gomes will determine who will be the first to get a title shot against the winner of the Featherweight Championship Main Event.

The event aired on cable and satellite pay-per-view in the United States and Canada in addition to their online PPV stream, as the promotion has come to a deal with Integrated Sports Media for live viewing at 9:00 p.m. ET – 6:00 p.m. PT on both cable and satellite pay-per-view via iN Demand, DISH, Avail-TVN in the United States and Bell TV in Canada, for a suggested retail price of $14.95. The event was also available as an Internet Pay-per-View for $14.95 from Ustream.

Livia von Plettenberg was scheduled to fight Laura Sanko but Sanko withdrew from the fight on April 26 due to pregnancy. She was replaced by Cassie Robb. On June 4, Carla Esparza withdrew from her Strawweight title defense due to a knee injury and was replaced by Cláudia Gadelha, who was originally scheduled to fight Joanne Calderwood. Calderwood was then matched up against Sarah Schneider. On June 23, Schneider also withdrew due to injury and was replaced by Norma Rueda Center. On June 26, Julia Budd withdrew from her fight against Ediane Gomes due to injury and was replaced by Charmaine Tweet. However, on July 10, Tweet announced that she was unable to make the fight due to visa issues and she was replaced by Tamikka Brents just three days before the event in what was to be a catchweight fight at 150 lbs. Brents weighed in 5 pounds over so the fight was made a lightweight fight. On July 12, the day before the event at the weigh-ins, it was announced that Veronica Rothenhausler was deemed medically unable to compete after passing out due to her weight cut thus canceling her planned fight with Mollie Estes although Estes did still receive her fight purse. The planned fight between Cassie Robb and Livia von Plettenberg was also canceled due to von Plettenberg failing to make the weight limit. Due to this, a new fight was made between Livia von Plettenberg and Kathina Catron. During the event, it was announced that Tamikka Brents suffered an injury, canceling her fight with Ediane Gomes.

After the event, fight of the night was awarded to Leslie Smith & Jennifer Maia. Jessica Penne received the submission of the night bonus while knockout of the night went to Miriam Nakamoto.

Results

Bonus awards
The following fighters were awarded monetary bonuses:
Fight of the Night: Leslie Smith vs. Jennifer Maia
Knockout of the Night: Miriam Nakamoto
Submission of the Night: Jessica Penne

Invicta FC 5: Penne vs. Waterson

Invicta FC 5: Penne vs. Waterson was a mixed martial arts event held on April 5, 2013. Shannon Knapp announced during Invicta FC 4 that the event would be headlined by a co-main event of Jessica Penne defending her Invicta FC Atomweight Championship against Michelle Waterson along with a flyweight championship bout between Vanessa Porto and Barb Honchak and that Sarah Kaufman would make her Invicta debut on the show. The show was originally targeted for April 13, however Knapp announced they would change it to April 5 after the UFC announced a show on that date.

On February 5, 2013 it was announced that Invicta FC had signed Zoila Frausto Gurgel and she would make her debut at Invicta FC against Jennifer Maia.

On February 15, 2013, Shannon Knapp announced that Invicta FC had signed Cris Cyborg to debut at Invicta 5 against Ediane Gomes. The signing was notable because it was the first professional bout for Santos since her suspension in December 2011 while competing in the now-defunct Strikeforce organization. The winner of the fight will face Marloes Coenen at Invicta FC 6 to crown the first Invicta FC Featherweight Champion. Gomes was originally scheduled to fight Julia Budd but was moved when Santos was signed. Budd was instead booked to face Fiona Muxlow. On March 19, 2013, Ediane Gomes suffered an injury and was forced to withdraw from the fight with Santos. As a result, Fiona Muxlow was moved to fight Santos and Budd was matched against another new opponent in Mollie Estes. Mollie's original opponent was Veronica Rothenhausler, but Veronica suffered an injury and was dropped from the card allowing Estes to be moved into the fight with Budd.

A fight between River Jones and Lauren Barefoot was originally scheduled to take place on the preliminary card but was canceled when Jones suffered an injury. Cassie Rodish was originally scheduled to fight Nicdali Rivera-Calanoc but Nicdali was forced to withdraw due to injury on March 11 and she was replaced by Simona Soukupova. Kaitlin Young was set to fight Amanda Nunes, but Nunes suffered an arm injury in training and was replaced by Lauren Taylor.

After the event, fight of the night went to Sarah Kaufman and Leslie Smith. Submission of the night went to Rose Namajunas and knockout of the night went to Miriam Nakamoto. Additionally, Bec Hyatt and Jessica Penne both received social media bonuses for promoting the event.

The event was the first successful Internet Pay-Per-View for Invicta, broadcast for $9.95 by Ustream.

Results

Bonus awards
The following fighters were awarded monetary bonuses:
Fight of the Night: Sarah Kaufman vs. Leslie Smith ($1,500 each)
Submission of the Night: Rose Namajunas
Knockout of the Night: Miriam Nakamoto (revoked after the Missouri Office of Athletics ruled Nakamoto had won due to an illegal knee)

Invicta FC 4: Esparza vs. Hyatt 

The event was headlined by a strawweight championship bout between Carla Esparza and Bec Hyatt. Esparza was originally scheduled to fight Ayaka Hamasaki for the title but Hamasaki pulled out of the fight due to commitments to defending her JEWELS lightweight title in December and was replaced by undefeated Brazilian fighter Cláudia Gadelha. On December 28, Gadelha was forced to withdraw from the main event title fight after suffering a broken nose in training. Gadelha was replaced by Bec Hyatt, who was originally set to face Joanne Calderwood. As a result, Calderwood's opponent was changed to Livia von Plettenberg. On December 19, Shannon Knapp announced Invicta FC 4 would air as an online pay-per-view however due to purchasing issues on the night of the event, the idea was thrown out and it was announced that all buyers would be refunded. The price for the Ustream run iPPV for IFC4 was $7.95.

After the event, fight of the night (US$1,500 bonus to each fighter) went to Alexis Davis and Shayna Baszler. The submission of the night bonus (US$1,000 bonus) went to Rose Namajunas while knockout of the night (US$1,000 bonus) went to Veronica Rothenhausler. Additionally, Bec Hyatt and Jodie Esquibel both received a social media bonus.

Results

Bonus awards
The following fighters were awarded monetary bonuses:
Fight of the Night: Alexis Davis vs. Shayna Baszler ($1,500 each)
Knockout of the Night: Veronica Rothenhausler ($1,000)
Submission of the Night: Rose Namajunas ($1,000)

Source(s)

Invicta FC 3: Penne vs. Sugiyama 

Invicta President Shannon Knapp has announced that the event will feature the first championship bout for Invicta Fighting Championships. Invicta will continue their partnership with JEWELS as Jessica Penne will face unbeaten JEWELS Featherweight Queen (105 lb.) Naho Sugiyama for the Invicta FC Atomweight Championship. Sara McMann was originally scheduled to fight for Invicta FC Bantamweight Championship but will be recovering from injury. Knapp has since announced that a fight will be held to determine who eventually faces McMann for the championship. On August 27, Invicta added former Strikeforce women's champion Sarah Kaufman to the card in a fight against Kaitlin Young. However, on September 17, Kaufman was forced to withdraw due to injury.

Leslie Smith was originally scheduled to fight Cat Zingano, but the promotion allowed Zingano to withdraw from the fight so that she could accept a fight for Strikeforce. Zingano was replaced by pro boxer and undefeated MMA fighter, Kim Connor-Hamby. Katalina Malungahu was scheduled to fight Taylor Stratford, however Stratford was forced to withdraw due to a knee injury. Stratford was replaced by Ediane Gomes. Sarah Kaufman was set to fight Kaitlin Young, however an injury forced Kaufman to withdraw from the fight on September 17. As a result, Leslie Smith was moved from her fight with Connor-Hamby to fight Young in what was to be a rematch from Invicta FC 1 where they fought to a draw. Raquel Pennington was added as the new opponent for Kim Connor-Hamby. On September 26, Connor-Hamby withdrew from the fight due to injury. After Strikeforce canceled their previously scheduled event, Cat Zingano was added back to the Invicta 3 card as the replacement opponent against Pennington. Julia Budd was set to fight Elaina Maxwell but Maxwell withdrew after suffering a concussion in training and was replaced by Danielle West.

Tara LaRosa (127.6 lbs) and Lacey Schuckman (106.2 lbs) failed to make weight at the weigh in. Schuckman was able to get within 1 pound of her 105 weight class limit within the next two hours and was fined 10% of her purse. LaRosa was not able to get within one pound of 125 pounds within two hours and was fined 25% of her purse. After the event, fight of the night (US$1,500 bonus to each fighter) went to Michelle Waterson and Lacey Schuckman. The submission of the night bonus (US$1,000 bonus) was split between Jessamyn Duke and Stephanie Frausto while knockout of the night (US$1,000 bonus) went to Joanne Calderwood.

Results

Bonus awards
The following fighters were awarded monetary bonuses:
Fight of the Night: Michelle Waterson vs. Lacey Schuckman ($1,500 each)
Knockout of the Night: Joanne Calderwood ($1,000)
Submission of the Night: Stephanie Frausto and Jessamyn Duke ($500 each)

Source(s)

Invicta FC 2: Baszler vs. McMann

Like the first event, it was made available as a free stream on the promotion's official website. The event was headlined by
2004 Summer Olympics women's freestyle wrestling silver medalist Sara McMann and Shayna Baszler. It will be the second event of the promotion.

As part of the alliance with Japanese promotion JEWELS, JEWELS Lightweight Queen (115 lbs.) Ayaka Hamasaki was set to face undefeated Austrian fighter Jasminka Cive as part of the main event but Cive was unable to secure her visa in time and has been replaced by Lacey Shuckman. Angelica Chaves was scheduled to fight Kikuyo Ishikawa on the card, but Ishikawa withdrew from the fight on June 7. Ishikawa was replaced by Nicdali Rivera-Calanoc.

Vanessa Porto was scheduled to fight Kelly Kobold but on June 25, Kobold withdrew from the fight due to a shoulder injury suffered while training. Kobold was replaced by Sarah D'Alelio.

Amanda Nunes was scheduled to fight Milana Dudieva but Dudieva withdrew from the fight on July 9 due to a medical illness and was replaced by Leslie Smith. However, on July 20, Smith suffered a hand injury that forced her to also withdraw from the fight and she was then replaced by Raquel Pa'aluhi in the fight with Nunes.

Jessica Phillipus missed weight for her bout and forfeited 25% of her fight purse.

Results

Bonus awards
The following fighters were awarded monetary bonuses:
Fight of the Night: Sara McMann vs. Shayna Baszler ($1,500 each)
Submission of the Night: Sarah D'Alelio and Alexis Davis ($1,000 each)
Knockout of the Night: none awarded

Source(s)

Invicta FC 1: Coenen vs. Ruyssen

It was headlined by former Strikeforce women's bantamweight champion Marloes Coenen and French fighter Romy Ruyssen, who had lost to Coenen by 2nd round submission in her second professional fight in 2008. The event also marked the MMA debut of 2008 Summer Olympics women's freestyle wrestling medalist Randi Miller.

The event was not televised, but was available as a free video stream at the Invicta Fighting Championships webpage. Fighters Sofia Bagherdai, Randi Miller, Ashleigh Curry, and Romy Ruyssen missed weight for their bouts. Bagherdai and Curry forfeited 10% of their purse to their opponent, while Miller and Ruyssen forfeited 25% of their purse to their opponent.

Results

Bonus awards
The following fighters were awarded monetary bonuses:
Fight of the Night: Kaitlin Young vs. Leslie Smith ($1,500 each)
Submission of the Night: Sarah Schneider ($1,000)
Knockout of the Night: none awarded
Social Media bonuses: Liz Carmouche and Jessica Penne ($1,000 each)Source(s)

See also
List of current Invicta FC fighters

External links
 Invicta FC event results on Sherdog

References

Events
2012 in mixed martial arts
Mixed martial arts events lists
2013 in mixed martial arts
2014 in mixed martial arts
2015 in mixed martial arts
2016 in mixed martial arts
2017 in mixed martial arts
2018 in mixed martial arts
2019 in mixed martial arts
2020 in mixed martial arts
2021 in mixed martial arts
2022 in mixed martial arts
2023 in mixed martial arts
Women's sport-related lists
Women's mixed martial arts